The Franschhoek Motor Museum maintains a collection of vehicles, motorcycles, and bicycles dating back over 100 years and is located in Franschhoek, South Africa.  It is owned by billionaire Johann Rupert.

External links

References

Museums in South Africa
Transport museums in South Africa
Auto racing museums and halls of fame